Francisco Javier Treviño Ibarguen (born December 17, 1981) is a Mexican mixed martial artist with American citizenship. He competes in the Lightweight division, and formerly fought for the UFC.

He was born in Reynosa, Tamaulipas but grew up in Camargo, Tamaulipas and emigrated with his family to McAllen, Texas at the age of four. Treviño played American football in high school, but after graduating he found himself gaining weight and eventually reaching an obese figure of over 250 pounds. He joined Muay Thai classes to lose weight, beginning his 100-pound transformation. After sparring with a mixed martial arts (MMA) fighter and feeling like he could hold his own, he decided to take up Brazilian jiu-jitsu (BJJ) as well.

Only a few months after the sparring session, he made his professional debut in MMA, defeating Shaun Wagner by first-round submission on August 2, 2013, at South Texas FC 3: War Zone. He won ten straight fights in STFC between 2008 and 2013 at middleweight and welterweight. On November 15, 2013, he fought for Legacy Fighting Championship, defeating Lester Batres by unanimous decision (UD) at Legacy FC 25 in Houston. Two days later, he signed a deal with the UFC, dropping even further down to lightweight division. He became the sixth Mexican-born fighter to ever join the promotion.

Mixed martial arts record

|-
|-
| Loss
| align=center| 13–3
| J. J. Ambrose
| Submission (guillotine choke)
| Hex Fight Series 6
| 
| align=center| 2
| align=center| 4:35
| Melbourne, Victoria, Australia
|
|-
| Win
| align=center| 13–2
| J. J. Ambrose
| Decision (split)
| Hex Fight Series 5
| 
| align=center| 3
| align=center| 5:00
| Melbourne, Victoria, Australia
|
|-
| Loss
| align=center| 12–2
| Sage Northcutt
| TKO (elbows and punches)
| UFC 192
| 
| align=center| 1
| align=center| 0:57
| Houston, Texas, United States
|
|-
| Loss
| align=center| 12–1
| Johnny Case
| Decision (unanimous)
| UFC 188
| 
| align=center| 3
| align=center| 5:00
| Mexico City, Mexico
| 
|-
| Win
| align=center| 12–0
| Renée Forte
| Decision (unanimous)
| UFC 171
| 
| align=center| 3
| align=center| 5:00
| Dallas, Texas, United States
| 
|-
| Win
| align=center| 11–0
| Lester Batres
| Decision (unanimous)
| Legacy Fighting Championship 25
| 
| align=center| 3
| align=center| 5:00
| Houston, Texas, United States
| 
|-
| Win
| align=center| 10–0
| Joseph Daily
| Decision (unanimous)
| STFC 24: Bad Blood
| 
| align=center| 5
| align=center| 5:00
| McAllen, Texas, United States
| 
|-
| Win
| align=center| 9–0
| Corey Bellino
| KO (punch)
| STFC 21: Rampage
| 
| align=center| 1
| align=center| 4:19
| McAllen, Texas, United States
| 
|-
| Win
| align=center| 8–0
| Jorge Cortez
| Decision (unanimous)
| STFC 19: Relentless
| 
| align=center| 3
| align=center| 5:00
| McAllen, Texas, United States
| 
|-
| Win
| align=center| 7–0
| Andrew Garza
| TKO (punches)
| STFC 16: All or Nothing
| 
| align=center| 3
| align=center| 0:48
| McAllen, Texas, United States
| 
|-
| Win
| align=center| 6–0
| Will Florentino
| Submission (armbar)
| STFC 12: Tuff Enough
| 
| align=center| 1
| align=center| 1:17
| McAllen, Texas, United States
| 
|-
| Win
| align=center| 5–0
| Larry Hopkins
| Submission (kneebar)
| STFC 8: Fired Up!
| 
| align=center| 1
| align=center| 1:31
| McAllen, Texas, United States
| 
|-
| Win
| align=center| 4–0
| Kristopher Flores
| TKO (punches)
| STFC 6: Evolution
| 
| align=center| 1
| align=center| 2:57
| Odessa, Texas, United States
| 
|-
| Win
| align=center| 3–0
| Cole Nuckols
| TKO (punches)
| STFC 5: Night of Champions
| 
| align=center| 2
| align=center| 1:42
| Odessa, Texas, United States
| 
|-
| Win
| align=center| 2–0
| George Zamarron
| Submission (punches)
| STFC 4: Fuentes vs. King
| 
| align=center| 1
| align=center| 1:49
| McAllen, Texas, United States
| 
|-
| Win
| align=center| 1–0
| Shaun Wagner
| Submission
| STFC 3: War Zone
| 
| align=center| 1
| align=center| 2:56
| McAllen, Texas, United States
|

See also
List of male mixed martial artists

References

External links
 
 

1981 births
Living people
American male mixed martial artists
Mexican male mixed martial artists
Lightweight mixed martial artists
Mixed martial artists utilizing Muay Thai
Mixed martial artists utilizing Brazilian jiu-jitsu
American sportspeople in doping cases
Doping cases in mixed martial arts
Mexican emigrants to the United States
American mixed martial artists of Mexican descent
Mixed martial artists from Texas
People from Reynosa
Ultimate Fighting Championship male fighters
American Muay Thai practitioners
American practitioners of Brazilian jiu-jitsu
Sportspeople from Tamaulipas
People from McAllen, Texas